Yizhang County is a county in Hunan Province, China, it is under the administration of the prefecture-level city of Chenzhou. As of 2015, it had a registered population of 644,300 and a resident population of 589,400.

Location
Located on the southern margin of the province, it is adjacent to the south of the city proper in Chenzhou, and near the northern border of Guangdong. The county borders to the north by Zixing City, Suxian and Beihu Districts, to the west by Linwu County, Lianzhou City of Guangdong, to the south and the southeast by Yangshan, Ruyuan Counties and Lechang City of Guangdong and Rucheng County.

Administration
The county has 14 towns and five townships under its jurisdiction, the county seat is Yuxi Town.

14 towns
 Baishidu
 Bali
 Huangsha
 Litian
 Liyuan
 Meitian
 Tiantang
 Wuling
 Yangmeishan
 Yanquan
 Yaogangxian
 Yiliu
 Yingchun
 Yuxi

4 townships
 Changcun
 Chishi
 Guanxi
 Jiangshui

1 ethnic township
 Yao Mangshan

History
In early 1928 Zhu De's troops, survivors of the Nanchang Uprising, Little Long March and Battle of Shantou, found refuge here with the local warlord. Chen Yi was with him; neither dared reveal his identity at the time. It was from here that a rested and bolstered communist column marched to the Jinggangshan Mountains in April to join the hold-outs from another uprising.

County town
The county town is at the border between Hunan and Guangdong. The national highway from Guangzhou to Beijing passes through the middle of the town.

Environment
A beautiful tourist park is Mangshan Mountain National Forest Park.  The 1902-meter peak of Shikengkong, on the interprovincial border, stands some 50 km south of the county town.

Mangshan pitviper and Mangshan horned toad have been described as new species to science from specimens collected from Mangshan (Mount Mang).

Climate

See also
 Chishi Bridge

References

External links 

 
Geography of Chenzhou
County-level divisions of Hunan